is a railway station on the Tobu Skytree Line in Sumida, Tokyo, Japan, operated by the private railway operator Tobu Railway.

Lines

Station layout
The station consists of two opposed side platforms serving two tracks with two additional centre tracks for non-stopping trains.

Platforms

History

The station opened on 1 April 1902.

From 17 March 2012, station numbering was introduced on all Tobu lines, with Kanegafuchi Station becoming "TS-06".

Passenger statistics
In fiscal 2014, the station was used by an average of 12,553 passengers daily.

Surrounding area
 Arakawa River
 Sumida River
 Sumidagawa Shrine
 Mokuboji Temple

See also
 List of railway stations in Japan

References

External links

  

Railway stations in Japan opened in 1902
Railway stations in Tokyo